Yurino is a rural locality (a village) in Cherkutinskoye Rural Settlement, Sobinsky District, Vladimir Oblast, Russia. The population was 34 as of 2010.

Geography 
The village is located 4 km west from Cherkutino, 38 km north-west from Sobinka.

References 

Rural localities in Sobinsky District